El Momento Siguiente is the 21st album by the Australian psychedelic rock band The Church and their second in the Liberation Acoustic Series, following 2005's El Momento Descuidado. The title translates from Spanish as "The Following Moment."

The album, released in February 2007, consists of newly recorded acoustic versions of previously released songs, plus three new compositions and a cover of the Triffids' "Wide Open Road". It was reissued in 2009 on the band's own Unorthodox Records label.

Reception 

AllMusic's Ned Raggett gave El Memento Siguiente four stars out of five: he opined that "arguably much of the interest in [this album] lies in what the band chose this time around; as before, the group wisely looks through most of its career... [it] shows that the band's considerable skills seem only to improve; the rich feeling of so many of the performances belies the deathly dull label of 'going acoustic' as has so often been the case with other acts."

John Bergstrom of PopMatters rated it at six out of ten and explained, that it "is another welcome opportunity to experience some excellent musicians playing generally excellent songs in a new light. Stripped of the sometimes gauzy production of their regular albums, the Church sound as vital as you might have forgotten they've always been."

Track listing

Personnel 

The Church
Steve Kilbey – lead vocals, bass guitar, keyboards, guitar
Peter Koppes – guitars, keyboards, bass guitar, vocals
Tim Powles – drums, percussion, backing vocals
Marty Willson-Piper – guitars, bass guitar, vocals

Additional musicians
 Jorden Brebach – bass guitar (tracks 7 & 10)
 Amanda Brown – violin (racks 2, 6 & 8), melodica (track 9)
 Sophie Glasso – cello (tracks 2, 4, 6 & 8)
 Tiare Helberg – piano (track 12), percussion (track 10)
 Inga Liljeström – vocals (tracks 4 & 11)

Production and artwork
 William Bowden – mastering at King Willy Sound
 Petra Bright, Tiare Helberg, Peter Koppes, Rodney Navarre
 The Church – producer
 Ben Garrard – assistant engineer
 Ted Howard – recording, mixing at Rancom Street Studios, Botany Bay, Sydney
 Steve Kilbey – painting
 Samantha McFadden – design

Notes 

The Church (band) albums
2007 albums